Zhang Xiaoguang (born May 1966) is a Chinese military pilot and taikonaut selected as part of the Shenzhou program.

Biography
He was born in May 1966 in Jinzhou, to a family of Manchu ethnicity and was a squadron commander in the People's Liberation Army Air Force when he was selected to be an astronaut in 1998. He had accumulated 1000 flight-hours as of 2004. He was selected as part of the backup crew for the Shenzhou 9 mission. In 2013, he was selected to fly Shenzhou 10, the third spaceflight to the first Chinese space station Tiangong 1.

Career
Shenzhou 10 was launched on 11 June 2013, at 09:38 UTC (17:38 local time) on a Long March 2F rocket. It docked to the Tiangong-1 space station, and the crew spent 12 days on board.
Zhang returned to Earth on Wednesday, 26 June 2013 00:07 UTC. Total mission duration was 14 days 14 hours and 29 minutes.

References

Zhang Xiaoguan at the Encyclopedia Astronautica. Accessed 23 July 2005.
Spacefacts biography of Zhang Xiaoguan

Shenzhou program astronauts
Living people
1966 births
People's Liberation Army Astronaut Corps